Francis Wright may refer to:
 Francis Mastin Wright (1810–1869), Ohio Republican politician
 Francis Augustus Wright (1835–1903), Australian politician and merchant sailor
 Francis Marion Wright (1844–1917), United States federal judge
 Francis Wright (cricketer) (1874–1899), Australian cricketer
 Francis Wright (actor) (born 1958), English actor and puppeteer 
 Francis Wright (academic) (c. 1610–1659), English Church of England clergyman, Oxford don, and schoolmaster
 Francis Wright (industrialist) (1806–1873), English industrialist
 Felix (musician) or Francis Wright, British DJ and producer

See also
 Frances Wright (disambiguation)
 Frank Wright (disambiguation)